Pefkos (before 1928: Τούχουλη - Touchouli) is a village in Kastoria Regional Unit, Macedonia, Greece.

Touchouli was inhabited by an Albanian speaking population. The Greek census (1920) recorded 334 people in the village and in 1923 there were 50 inhabitants (or 10 families) who were Muslim.

References

Populated places in Kastoria (regional unit)